Kinar may refer to:
 Kinar (film), a 2018 Malayalam film, also released in Tamil as Keni
 Kinar, East Azerbaijan or Qeynar, a village in Iran
 Kinar, Markazi or Ghinar, a village in Iran